The 1992 FIRS Intercontinental Cup was the fifth edition of the roller hockey tournament known as the Intercontinental Cup, played in March 1992. OC Barcelos won the cup, defeating Sertãozinho HC.

Matches

See also
FIRS Intercontinental Cup

References

FIRS Intercontinental Cup
1992 in roller hockey
1992 in Brazilian sport
International roller hockey competitions hosted by Brazil